The Jewish community of Brody (a city in the Lviv region of western Ukraine) was one of the oldest and best-known Jewish communities in the western part of Ukraine (and formerly in Austrian Empire / Poland up to 1939). The Jewish community of Brody perished in the Holocaust in 1942–1943. During the 19th century, Brody was the second-largest city in East Galicia (after Lviv (Lemberg)), with the highest proportion of the Jewish population (88%) among Eastern European cities.

"A city, where wisdom and wealth, Torah and understanding, commerce and faith are united."

Nachman Krochmal in a letter to Isaac Erter

Importance of the Jewish community of Brody

When one speaks about any major sort of modern scholarly or historiographic activities in Eastern Galicia that started with Haskalah movement in this area, such activities are bound to three exclusive centers of the Galician Enlightenment, namely: Lviv, Ternopil, and Brody. Today the latter is a non-significant West Ukrainian town, administrative center of Brodovsky rayon in the northeastern fringe of the Lviv oblast. There are few towns in Western Ukraine with so dramatic and challenging Jewish history as it is in case of Brody. For a long time Brody had been one of the greatest centers of commerce in the whole Austro-Hungarian Empire. It was rightly referred to as Triest on the continent. The town has been known yet since the 12th century and soon after was almost entirely inhabited by the Jews. Because of the last fact it came known to be as Galician Jerusalem. During the Austrian rule in Galicia, the North Eastern fringe of the empire passed just a few kilometres from Brody. It was the border of two greatest East European empires at that time Austrian and Russian and Brody by the luck or misfortune of history happened to be squeezed between the two borders. By misfortune, because of its border location it was twice utterly destroyed first during the First World War and again in 1944. By luck, because the city took a great commercial benefit and privileges being a border city. Because of its location, in 1779, Brody received the status of a "free city" and could trade with all the European countries. Worthwhile to note that in the 18th century the commercial turnover of Brody city exceeded the turnover of whole province of Galicia taken together. In the 19th century it was the second largest city on the territory of Galicia after Lemberg. Its "sister city" over the Russian side of the border was Radyvyliv just 9 km east of Brody. Radyvyliv played a similar function as Brody on the Russian side of the border.

Unlike in other parts of Eastern Galicia, not only the town of Brody but also the villages around it had a significant proportion of the Jews. Even a remote tiny forest village of Stanislavchyk, 15 km north east of the city, surrounded by hip plantations, boasts a Jewish heritage and had many Jews living there, most likely moving there from Brody. An old desolate Jewish graveyard in Stanislavchyk bears witness to its vivid Jewish past.

Austrian authorities associated enlightened Jews as such with the free city of Brody. The governor of Galicia aptly noted that in Galicia there are Orthodox, Hasidim and Karaites, but enlightened Jews can be found only in Brody. Brody was the second largest city (after Lemberg) in East Galicia with the largest proportion of the Jewish population among perhaps of all the district cities in Europe ever (88%). Brody stands out as Jewish cultural and economic center in the area, a "symbol". Brody was tax free city during early Austrian rule, that fact which promoted its commercial status to the central commercial hub of Eastern Galicia (linking it with the major European trade centers such as Leipzig). Its international commercial links promoted bringing of new ideas, foreign culture, enlightenment making Brody an intellectual center. There were not many cities Europe with nearly exclusively Jewish population, except Brody, and to a certain degree Berdychiv in Russian Ukraine and Thessaloniki in Greece. In 1827, out of total number 11,718 Jewish merchants and shopkeepers in the whole of Galicia, 1,134 (about 10%) were in Brody. The same year, Brody was home to 36 Jewish brokers and 9 Jewish bankers. Jews owned 163 (93%) large commercial and industrial enterprises in Brody (175 in total).

Early Jewish history of Brody

In Toldot Yehudei Brody (The History of the Jews of Brody) Nathan-Michael Gelber was wrong by saying the city was founded by Stanisław Żółkiewski in 1584. Though Żołkiewski indeed received a permission from Polish king Stefan Batory to establish a center following Magdeburg city laws in Brody. Brody as a settlement was first mentioned in the medieval "Teaching of Vladimir Monomah to the children", grand duke of Chernigov and Kiev. The source notes that Brody served twice as a meeting place of Chernigov duke Vladimir II Monomah and Volhynian duke St. Yaropolk Izyaslavich. These events took place in 1084 and 1086 and the prior date formally figures as a beginning of Brody history in local historiography. Nathan Gelber writes also that Brody was originally a city called "Lubeszów." The last statement needs to be corrected as well. Naming Brody as Lubicz was an unlucky attempt undertaken by the same Stanisław Żółkiewski who used the "Lubicz" from his family's coat of arms. The new name did not take hold and already in the documents of the 1590s the city figures as Brody. In the year 1648, during the Hmelnytsky massacres in Poland, 400 Jewish families lived in Brody, quite a significant number of Jews for a Polish town in that period. Until 1664, Brody was a "sub-kahal" of Lviv, i.e. under the administration of the Lviv Jewish Community. From the 17th century, Brody became an important center of Jewish trade (esp. horse fairs) and artisans. In 1756 Brody was home to 7191 Jews, reaching 14.718 in 1880 (out of 19.977 of total town inhabitants). Among the six largest Jewish commercial firms in Brody in 1849 were M. Nathanson, with 40,000 florins in the capital, Yidl Nathanson and Nirenstein with 30,000 florins each.

Hasidism in Brody 

Besides its commercial importance, the city was of a great Talmudic and scholarly importance, where Talmudists and Hasidim fought and coexisted. The famous sages of Brody Kloiz were "the lions and tigers in the Torah and in piety".

In about 1720 it was a home to the founder of Hasidism Baal Shem Tov. 
Dubnow gives a vivid account of the Brody phase in Besht biographical history. Baal Shem Tov arrived in Brody at the age of 20 when his religious outlook was taking shape, yet before making himself public  all over western Ukrainian lands. Dubnow states that Besht settled in some village by Brody. He engaged in the profession of melamed, teacher of the youngsters. As he was not well trained in the Talmud, Simon Dubnow presumes he was an elementary level teacher instructing children in prayer, reading and translating Torah. Despite his insignificant position, soon after he earned a respect and fame in Brody. His honesty, non-passionate meek character, humbleness and life gained wisdom attracted the attention of the surrounding common people, heading to him for consultations and court advice. So happened that among the suppliants was Ephraim Kutover, the father to  Brody rabbi Gershon Kutover. The seeker was so pleased with Besht's decision in his matter, that after getting knowing him closer and that he is a widower he offered him to marry his divorced daughter.

Shevhei ha-Besht explicitly mentions the existence of pre-Besht era Hasidic circle in Brody. The source mentions Brody as the place where Besht was first made a Rabbi of local Hasidim: "...the conventicle of great pietists Hasidim in that city Brody...who made him their rabbi." Though first Besht was rejected by Brody's kabbalistic brotherhood as he did not match the traditional qualifications to be admitted. But eventually, thanks to his charisma he gained respect of the fellows. Besht had high regard for those "great Hasidim" of the Brody circle and it seems quite plausible that the Baalshem intended to organise a similar fellowship of his own or wanted to unite with a brotherhood of Brody kind.

However the married couple was later expelled out of Brody settling in Kuty, some 100 km to the south at the foothills of the Carpathians.
However the kabbalistic fellowship of Brody did not act on social scale. It was a closed circle of pietists who used to gather at Brody Study Hall, founded around 1736, not spreading their activities beyond that.

"Ban of Hasidism" (1772) by Brody Jewish community

When thanks to Besht, the Hasidism started taking a shape of large-scale social phenomenon, in 1772 the same Brody Community issued a famous harsh ban against its own "son and offspring" Besht and "illness infected" Hasidim with the strange exception of allowing the prayer in Lurianic rite. Gershon Kutover (Brody native, secretary to Baal Shem Tov and his brother-in-law, who settled in Palestine later) was here to defend his employer when Brody sages were preparing to anathematise him, and so they did. Brody ban of 1772 encompassed a great number of Hasidic practices, including Hasidic shehitah (slaughter by Talmud forbidden honed shehitah knives / geschleefeene) that irritated the Misnagdim. Brody ban justly predicted the impact the movement might have in Galicia. The proclamation is included in the pamphlet Zamir arisim ve-harevot surim. Brodyites expressed their concern that the new heresy can bring a catastrophe on whole Polish Jewry discrediting God's name in the same way as Frankists and Sabbateans did. Brody sages feared that the sect was particularly dangerous as there was no high authority to interfere after dissolution of the Great Council of Fours Lands. Brody declaration caused great furore on the tsaddiks when learning of it, who in their turn became even more active in a fight for a believer, as a cause of it.

Haskalah movement in Brody

Brody played a leading role in the Galician Haskalah movement. Moses Mendelsohn's teacher Israel ben Moses Ha-Levi of Zamość Lefin (who was born in Bibrka, Lviv region) choose Brody to be his final seat, where he died in April 1772. Israel Lefin spent part of his life in Berlin where he was teaching Mendelssohn, instructing him in mathematics and to whom he imparted his love for philosophy. Israel's sojourn in Berlin, however, was not a long one. Persecutions by the Orthodox rabbis forced him to seek another home, and he returned to Galician lands, settling in Brody, where he lived in great poverty. Israel Lefin was an outstanding Jewish astronomer, author of the Nezah Yisrael, dedicated to the astronomical and geometrical passages in both Talmuds (published in Frankfurt-on-Oder in 1741) and of Arubbot ha-Shamayim, treateas on ancient and modern astronomy. In his memoirs, Avrom Ber Gotlober gives a vivid account of the importance Brody had on the spreading of the Enlightenment ideas in Russia and Ukraine proper:

The Jews who lived in the large Galician cities were the first to be enlightened by the light of the wisdom of the RaMbeMaN [acronym for Moses Mendelssohn] and his followers. On the account of their travels they would travel to various Russian cities and bring with them at the same time the spices of their enlightenment and knowledge…In this regard Brody especially excelled, being a city of scholars and Maskilim who used to do business mostly with Russia. Everywhere that a merchant of Brody would come, he would excite the youth with his fine speaking – their eyes opened…and they would take up education...

Among the maskilim living in Brody in the 19th century, we find Dov Ber Blumenfeld, Isaac Erter and Joshua Heschel Schorr. The latter published periodical He-Halutz (the Pioneer) in Brody during 1852–1889. Adolf Stand, the president of Galician Zionists was elected to the Austrian parliament from Brody district in 1907. However, in 1911 he was forced to quit his deputy mandate due to the political intrigues initiated by the assimilationist .

Because of the highly commercial and internationalised nature of Brody Jewish community it was one of the most Germanised Galician cities. In May 1784 the first Josephinian style German Jewish Normal school was opened in Brody. In 1815 the first Jewish Realschule was established with German to be the main language of instruction.

Brody was home to the acclaimed Royal Gymnasium of archprince Rudolf (today it is Brody Gymnasium), which was once attended by the known Jewish writer Joseph Roth.  taught there as well and Roth was his student. The modern monument next to the school commemorates several outstanding figures that studied here. It is shaped in a rainbow of head figures associated with the establishment. Along with Roth's, it includes the sculptures of three Ukrainian cultural notabilities: painter Trush, folklorist Rozdolsky, scientist Shchurat and writer Tudor.

The issue of national identity of Brody Jews: "Brody school case" of 1880s

The issue of Jewish national identity, problem of Jewish national language and their recognition in the legal system of Habsburg monarchy was reflected in Brody school case and tribunal dispute from 1880. Since 1867 Austrian monarchy recognized the equal status of all the nationalities and languages used in the large multicultural state. The 19th paragraph of new Austro-Hungarian Constitution (from the 21st of Dec., 1867) was meant to guarantee equal national rights to all the ethnic group in the empire. In Brody where more than ¾ of the population were Jewish (out of ca. 20.000 of inhabitants) there was only one public school with instruction in German and two schools with Polish as instruction medium. Galician Regional School Council (Landesschulrat) in Lviv allowed opening of two more schools refusing however the wish of Brody town commune to have German for instruction language in these new schools. Council was only willing to allow them to be in Polish. In the end, in 1880 Brody town commune appealed with the complaint to the Tribunal of the State (Reichsgericht) in Vienna, after unsuccessful attempts to defend their claim at the Galician Landeschulrat and the Ministry of Religion and Science. In the State Tribunal Brody commune was represented by Dr  (1831–1894), who published the memorial on the situation of Jews in Austria in 1859. The Ministry of Education viewed Brody Israelites as not belonging to German nationality (against the views of Brody commune itself) while Brody and Galician Israelites did not want to acknowledge themselves neither to Polish nor to Ukrainian nationalities. According to Hye, Brody Jews could not use "the guaranteed constitutional rights as for nationality and language" and either to present themselves as a separate Hebrew ethnic group different from all other Austrian minorities what Hye declined pointing at several previous bans of usage of Hebrew language in the administrative life and non-recognition of "Hebrew tribe" by Austrian legislature. Pergin von Purschka, court councillor and member of the Highest Tribunal (Oberster Gerichtshof) considered that "the Jews joined only the language tribe (Sprachenstamm)." Though the last term was not verbum legale of Austrian legislature indifference to the term defining an ething group – Volkstamm. Two other board members (Dr Anton Rintelen and count Edmund Hartig) suggested to limit the discussion to the fact that "Brody Jews speak German and all other issues should be set aside". So it was decided in the strident tribunal case won by the Brodyites.

Brody - Jewish Jerusalem of Austrian Empire

The city name Brody derives from the Ukrainian word brid, which means 'ford' (German: Furt) changing in plural into brody 'fords'. Crossing a swampy ford on the way to the city one marvels with a question how could something referred to as "Jerusalem" in such a flat and boggy pine forested "mosquito area". What could attract the Jews here in the "fords"? The answer is indisputable – commerce and trade. Kratter, the contemporary of Joseph II, notes in his Briefe über den jetztigen Zustand Galiziens that Brody is the first and almost the only commercial city, where big enterprises are concentraned in the Jewish hands, except a few German trade and banking houses.

Brody's Jerusalemic association is not a sheer modern invention. The tradition ascribes this analogy to the emperor Joseph II, who visited Brody in 1774 and presumably said that Now, it is clear why I am designated to be Jerusalem king (one of the titles of Austrian emperors). Joseph's stay in Brody resulted in significant consequences. In 1778 he issues the decree that makes Brody a free town. This event quickly reflected on city development and life, marking a new era that lasted for 100 favourable years in all the respects. Yet in 1774 Joseph II freed Brody citizens from all the taxes under the condition of reconstruction of old houses and erecting of new ones. The market square was surrounded by new stone houses with basements for storage.

Many Jewish historians as Simon Dubnow (in The History of Hasidism), Raphael Mahler (in Hasidism and the Jewish Enlightenment) all frequently direct themselves and touch upon Brody, willingly or unwillingly, as Brody was in a fact a Jewish hub, one of the most important "bricks" in the Galician and Austrian Jewish history. And any historian undertaking a serious study of Jewish past in Galicia, should draw his attention to one of the primary Jewish historical clusters in the area, namely Brody.

Economic conditions of local Jewry and immigration to America after 1879

The Galician Jewish cultural development was directly linked with the international trade, as most of Eastern Galicia was economically impoverished peasant countryside. Notorious Russian Jewish journalist and writer Solomon Ansky who after great efforts visited Eastern Galicia, to inquire of the local Jewish state of affairs at the time of the outbreak of the First World War, gives subtly conclusive and very apt description of the land, which is worthy to cite:

Galicia is one of the poorest regions in Central Europe, if not the poorest. It has few natural resources, few mineral deposits. The soil is not particularly fertile; the farming methods are primitive and the harvests meagre. The deeply rooted Galicians, especially Ruthenians (i.e. Ukrainians) in the eastern part are barely educated and live roughly; they are more backward than the Russian muzhik. All this has of course effected the economic condition of Galician Jews, who numbered between 900.000 and 1 million before the war. Even Jews in the Austrian Empire enjoy equal rights, with equal access to all the professions and government jobs, those in Galicia are very poor and unsophisticated. This is confirmed by two sets of statistics: Galicia has the highest death rate among Jews and the highest immigration to America.

The decline of Brody started in 1879, when the city lost its rights as a free commercial city. In 1880 there were 15,316 Jews in town, who formed 76.3% of the total population. Only in 11 years, the Jewish population dropped to 12,751 in 1890.

Mentioning the Galician Jewish immigration to America, interesting to note that most of these immigrants (along with their Ukrainian and Polish immigrant fellows) were impoverished economic refugees who were not in possession even of 50 dollars. The statistical study done by Szyja Bornsztejn witnesses that for the year of 1914, 53.1% of Galician and Polish Jews immigrating to the United States did not possess any money at all when arriving on the American soil. 39.2% of possessed less than 50 dollars and only 7.7% possessed a sum over USD 50. If divided, the average sum at the hands of each Galician Jewish newcomer comprised only 22 dollars. Besides that Jewish immigration from Brody and surrounding Lviv, Ternopil and Volhyn voivodeships was among the highest in the years 1926–1929. From Ternopil province (including Brody district) it was 4.1%, from Volhyn province 7.5%, from Lviv province 9.1%, all of total Jewish population in the provinces.

First World War events: burning of Jewish Brody and Russian invasion

The key and turning point in the history of Brody was the Russian onslaught and burning of the city at the outbreak of the First World War. This drama and scope of the tragedy of these events closely echoes Josephus account of the Fall of Jerusalem, burning of the Last Temple and its siege by Titus legions. The havoc that dominated the city at that time was terrific. Modern Josephus in case of Brody was Russian Jewish journalist Solomon Ansky (born Shloyme-Zanvl ben Aaron Hacohen Rappoport) who witnessed the Russian invasion of Brody and described it in a great detail. Just like Josephus was on the Roman side of the conqueror, so was S. Ansky on the Russian one in case of Brody. Ansky's account of burning of Brody reflects the depth of the tragedy that befell Brody Jews with the outbreak of the war:

At the start of the war Brody's train station had gone up in flames. Now a ramshackle buffet had been set up in one of the ruins. When I entered, the place was packed with officers, who were standing at the buffet or around small tables, consuming borshch. I noticed that the soup bowls bore a Hebrew inscription that read "mazel tov", congratulations. The china had been evidently stolen from a Jewish hotel…The road to Brody was flanked by burned and desolate cottages. In the distance we saw a broad field covered with ruins. Soon the devastated town emerged from the grey mist of an early winter morning. There were blackened chimneys and burned walls as far as we could see, visible beneath a dusting of downy snow. The town looked like the ancient, mossy remnants of Pompeii. I noticed the schorched wall of a synagogue. Above the door, some Hebrew words had survived: How awesome is this place [from Genesis 28:17]. The verse was fitting for the ruins of the house of worship and for the entire spread of the shattered neighbourhood. Nestled among the wreckage I saw a small cottage almost embedded in the earth. It looked as if it had crouched down during the conflagration, hidden in the ground, and therefore survived. An old Jewish man was standing nearby, as poor and hunched as the cottage itself. When he saw me and my friend in our uniforms, he whipped off his cap and bowed deeply. I went over and asked in Yiddish, "How come your cottage escaped the fire?" The old man gaped at me, then shrugged and sighed. "Perhaps a miracle… Heaven granted us a place to starve to death." I gave him a rouble. He was so amazed he forgot to thank me. He stood motionless, gawking. We walked on among the burned ruins. I noticed something that I would see again and again: at every street corner, shiny metal signs in Russian had been nailed to the walls. The occupiers had given every street a fancy, new name: Pushkin Street, Gogol Street, Lermontov Street, and even Turgenev Street, if I remember correctly. The irony of naming these horribly deformed street after the luminaries of Russian culture had escaped the victors: they did not realize how offensive it was to the memory of our great Russian authors...

The burning of Brody had devoured almost half of the town – several hundred exclusively Jewish houses...With its old market place, the unsigned area looked impoverished and dejected. Many stores, especially the bigger one and richer ones, were locked or boarded up…The instant…I entered the market, we were surrounded by whole army of poor, ragged, famished kids, who were begging for a kopek. Most of them were Christian, but three or four were jewish. I gave each child a few kopeks, no matter what is his religion. But the instant I handed a coin to a Jew, all Christian children began shouting at me: "Don’t give him anything! Don’t give him anything! He is a Jew! The children were joined by a Jewish beggar, a strange woman of about sixty. She wore a red dress, her grey hair was powdered, and her movements were nervous. She stood before me, grinning, her nasty, hungry eyes glaring at me, and she sort of danced a little. Then in a hoarse voice, mangling the language, she began warbling a sentimental Russian song, "Ptichka Kanareyka", dearest little canary, about a young man who sends out a canary with a greeting for his beloved. The old beggar woman's screechy voice and outlandish appearance made a terrible impression on me. I gave her some coins and tried to hurry off. But she blocked my way, taring into my eyes and squawking her horrible song. She plainly expected me to be surprised that she could sing in Russian. I was haunted for the rest of the day by the nightmare of the beggar's appearance and performance.

Strange enough, but even greater destruction wave (if we consider Holocaust in Brody) befell upon Brody also during the Russian Civil War. Brody went in flames for the second time. Isaac Babel in his "The Death of Dolgushov" describes second burning of Brody:

The curtains of battle were moving toward the city. At noon, Korochaev, in a black cloak, the disgraced commander of the fourth division, fighting alone and seeking out death, flew past us. On the run he shouted to me: "Our communications links are broken! Radziwillow and Brody are in flames!" And he galloped off, fluttering, all black, with eyes like coal. On the plain, flat as a board, the brigades were repositioning themselves. The sun was rolling along in the crimson dust.

Jewish population of Brody in Poland

After the collapse of Habsburg monarchy Western Ukrainian lands were incorporated into Poland. According to the new administrative division, Brody district became part of newly created Tarnopol Voivodeship (Ternopil province) being administered from Ternopil, which by that time exceeded Brody in terms of attracting Jewish population becoming a home to 13.999 Jews (1931). While the number of Jews in Brody declined to 8.288.
  
Like the surrounding Lviv and Ternopil areas, Brody district had one of the highest concentration of Jews in the countryside.

After the First World War, Brody was not anymore a border city hub. It lost its geo-commercial and geo-cultural value. The borders of new Poland moved further eastwards and with the Holocaust there was no more Jewish Brody, and Brody as "city" itself, because Brody was 88% Jewish city. The following incorporation of Brody into the Soviet Ukraine and Ukrainiazation of the city, due to the influx of local Ukrainian peasantry from the rural areas basically into emptied (of urban Poles and Jews) Galician cities after 1944 turned Brody into a provincial town. The changes that occurred within basically 50 years are dramatic. The deeply changing character of Brody reflects and exemplifies at its best the cross-cultural historic experience of East Galician past. History of the Jews in Brody provides a demonstration of Jewish commercial and intellectual rise and decline in Eastern Galicia.

Jewish literary figures from Brody 

Famous Jewish literary historian  was Brody native. Jacob Goldenthal, one of the most renown Austrian orientalists was born at Brody, April 16, 1815 and died at Vienna Dec. 28, 1868. Goldenthal studied at the University of Leipzig. He was one of a few modern Jewish specialists on Sufism and Al-Ghazali. He issued Das Neue Zion, a monthly periodical in Leipzig (Nisan, 1845) of which only one number appeared. Another periodical which he edited, "Das Morgenland" was also short-lived.

It is no doubt that the greatest among the literary figures Brody ever produced to the world was Joseph Roth, famous Austrian Jewish writer, was born on 2 September 1894 in a southern part of Brody called Shvaby (after German "Schwaben"). His parents were Nahum Roth and Mariam (Grubel) Roth. His father died when Joseph was quite young. Grubel's family was raising little Joseph. From 1901 to 1913 had been studying in the local public school. In that school teaching was in German. He continued his studies in the above noted Brody gymnasium. The nostalgia for old days Austrian Brody was very strong in Roth's novels. He was missing his childhood and old Austrian lifestyle. His "March of Radetzky" showed author's moods and feelings. Roth masterly describes the Austrian epoch of his and local society's life. He showed different processes that were slowly destroying the great multicultural Habsburg state. Roth expresses his irony towards Franz Joseph. But at the same time through the lines the readers could feel nostalgia for stability in the society, old Galician folkways, even nostalgia after the Kaiser. The Austrian Gesellschaft für Literatur donated and fixed the memorial plate in honour of J. Roth in modern Brody with the words in Ukrainian and German: Der Dichter Joseph Roth hat im Mai 1913 an diesem Gymnasium die Matura sub Auspicis Imperatoris abgelegt.

From 1918 Brodyite J. Roth was working in Vienna's newspaper as a journalist. In 1920 he moved to Berlin where he became a journalist of Frankfurter Zeitung. From 1922 he was working in social democratic newspaper Vorvarts (Forward). This newspaper did match his personal beliefs. At the same year he married Frederica Raiher. When Nazis came to power Joseph left Berlin. He was moving from one European city to another. Last years of his life Roth spent in Paris where he died on May 27, 1939.

Brody produced also one of the most noted Israeli literary scholars, Hebrew and Yiddish writer, Knesset member, professor of Hebrew University Dov Sadan (born Stock, 1909–1989) who was born in Brody, Galicia and immigrated to Palestine in 1925. He was a member of the staff of the Davar daily newspaper and the Am Oved publishing house. In 1932, he served for four months as secretary to Shmuel Agnon, being his lifelong friend.

Brody's role in Russian, German, Italian and Hungarian Jewish history

Brody played a significant role in the history of Russian Jewry as well. Galician Jewish immigrants and merchants directed themselves westwards but also eastwards. Brody was a kind of Galician "Odessa". Zipperstein, in his study on Odessa describes the immigration of Brodyites to Odessa and the role of Brody in this Galician commercial wave to the Black Sea "pearl": Brody, "the rising star east of Lemberg", was seen by Russian maskilim as Galicia's cultural center.

In Odessa we find Brody synagogue established by Brody merchants in the 1840s. In Leipzig, at Keilstrasse 4 is another footprint of Brody commercial tycoons, Brody Synagogue, the only synagogue in Leipzig to survive Kristallnacht, because there had been "Aryan" tenants in the building's upper stories – was restored and re-consecrated. A. Yehuda (Osterzetzer) devoted a few pages on Brodyites in Leipzig in the Brody Yizkor Book. There is also Broder Synagogue in Jerusalem, managed by Jewish Orthodox community.

Hundreds of Jews all over the world trace their roots to Brody and as a result of it, many adopted the last name Brodsky, Brodski, Brodskiy, Brodowski, Brodovsky, Brodisch (meaning "from Brody") or simply Brody. Among them Russian violinist Adolph Brodsky (b. 1851), modern American singer Chuck Brodsky, Russian American poet Joseph Brodsky (1940–1996) - the winner of Nobel prize in Literature of 1987, Russian painter Isaac Brodsky (1883–1939). In the imperial history of Russian Jewry the most famous is the family of Meir Schorr who adopted the last name Brodsky (after he moved from Brody settling in Kiev). He had five sons: Israel Brodsky (1823–1889) who surpassed his brothers in wealth and philanthropy, Lazar Brodsky and Leon Brodsky who were practically at the head of sugar industry in Russia (owned 22 sugar factories and 3 refineries), Abraham Brodsky (1816–1884) settled in Odessa in 1858, where he became the most prominent member of the city council of Odessa being involved in sugar industry as well. Abraham's son Samuel (1846–1896) was also a member of the Odessa city council.

Israel Zolli, Brody born rabbi of Rome

Brody gave Italy its main rabbi as well. Brody native, Israel Zoller (in Italy he changed his last name for Eugenio Zolli) was born in 1881 in Brody. After finishing his studies he left Brody and settled in Trieste (Italian Triest and Galician Brody were within one state at that time – Austria-Hungary). Zoller became the chief rabbi of Trieste after World War I, professor of Hebrew at the University of Padua from 1927 to 1938, and, from 1939 he takes the post of the chief rabbi of Rome. His biography during the last two decades of his life is quite controversial and had a lot of resonance worldwide. In early September 1943, when the Nazis entered Rome, Zoller took refuge in the Vatican. At the end of the hostilities he reappeared to assume his position as rabbi, but was rejected by the community. In February 1945, Zoller converted to Catholicism, taking the name of Eugenio Maria (in homage to Pope Pius XII) returning to the Vatican. After the world war, he was professor of Semitic epigraphy and Hebrew at the University of Rome. Zoller is the author of a great number of works, especially on the biblical interpretation, Jewish history, liturgy, and Talmudic literature. Most were published in Italian and include Israele ("Israel", 1935), L’ebraismo ("Judaism", 1953), autobiographical reflections Before the Dawn (1954). His translation of the tractate Berakhot was published by a Catholic publishing house in 1968. Zoller died in Italy in 1956.

Iuliu Barasch, Brody born leader of Romanian Jews

The same concerns Romania, where the local Jewish community was headed by Brody native Iuliu (Julius) Barasch (Yehuda). He was born in Brody in 1815, settling in Romania where he was named the Mendelssohn of Romania, leader of the Bucharest community, author of the brochure L'emancipation des Israélites en Roumanie (1861). Barasch was among the organisers of the Romanian education system. He founded the first secular modern Israeli school (1852) in Bucharest, with Romanian-language classes. He was the director of the magazine Isis sau Natura (Isis or Nature, 18561859). He had an important activity in historiography, in 1862, he founded Societatea de Cultura Israelita (The society of Israelite culture).

Many other outstanding personalities are associated with Brody, namely Napoleonic leader and commander Baron, General Johann Hiller who was born in Brody in 1754, was commissioned into the Artillery in 1770, became known in the Napoleonic fights with the Turks from 1788 to 1791. Oscar Chajes, famous 19th-century Jewish chess player was born in Brody. The same roots had Daniel Daniel Abraham (Abe) Yanofsky, born in Brody in 1925 and settled in Canada with his family when he was just eight months old. He learned chess at the age of eight, after he and his father saw a chess board and pieces on sale for $1 in the People's Book Store window on Main Street in Winnipeg.

Israeli Rabbi Kalman Kahana was born and grew up in Brody. The Kahane family was notorious in Brody and included the 18th-century rabbi of Brody Abraham Kahane. In 1938 Kalman Kahana immigrated to Mandatory Palestine, becoming the leader of Poalei Agudat Yisrael and member of Provisional State Council. He went on to serve as a member of the Knesset from 1949 until 1981, also serving as Deputy Minister of Education and Culture between 1961 and 1966.

Pogrom refugees from Russia

After the pogroms in 1881, crowds of Russian Jews flooded into Brody, from where they headed for America or back to Russia. By summer of 1882 the number of Russian refugees in Brody reached 20.000, most of them stayed in Brody temporarily until the possibility of further immigration westwards. A local refugee relief committee was organised in Brody and a number of foreign representatives from Paris and Vienna Alliances, other major Jewish organisations were active at this time in the city, including such figures as Friedlander, Netter and Schafir. In the course of four months 1800 immigrants were transported on their way to America. After arrival of British deputies, the committee was reorganised and managed to send 11 trains with immigrants westwards (in one case 533 people in a go). Meanwhile, the number of refugees continued to grow. On 2 June 1882 it reached 12.476 individuals in 10 days the number increased to 12.668, despite the fact that 1.405 had been sent already within that week. The social situation deteriorated reaching a critical limit. Baron Hirsch entrusted his secretary Veneziani to buy spacious premises of an old clothing factory, where the refugees were consequently accommodated.

Holocaust in Brody

The Jewish community of Brody perished in the Holocaust. A great number of Brody Jews were murdered in the autumn of 1942. A group of 250 Brody Jewish intellectuals were shot near the Jewish cemetery in Brody (where the Holocaust monument stands now). Some of the surviving Brody Jews were imprisoned in the family camp of Pyanytsia (Pianica) in the forests near Lviv. All of the remaining Brody Jews were moved into the ghetto created in the town on January 1, 1943 (or December 1942). Another 3,000 Jews from neighbouring areas of Zolochiv, Lopatyn and Busk were subsequently added to Brody's ghetto. Horrible work conditions induced some young people to run away and join the Soviet army. The ghetto's poor hygiene and hunger were intolerable. Disease and famine took hundreds of Jewish lives. All 9,000 Jews of Brody ghetto were subsequently murdered on May 1, 1943. On September 19, 1942, around 2,500 Jews of Brody were deported to the extermination camp of Bełżec (today a little town on the Polish-Ukrainian border). On November 2, 3,000 more Jews were sent from Brody to Bełżec extermination camp. Many Brody Jews were exterminated in Majdanek concentration camp near Lublin (a city in the south east corner of Poland). Several hundred Brody Jews returned to the city after the war, most having hidden with the partisans in the forest, some few  survivors of concentration camps (as was Jacob Jakubovics) or those who may have fled or been deported to Soviet territory.

Brody rabbis and synagogue

The great synagogue (famous Brody Kloiz) was founded in 1742 with the initiative of Mose Rokach.

The first known rabbis of Brody were:

 Saul Katzenellenbogen (1664–1673)
 Isaak Krakower (1674–1673), the founder of Babad family. Isaak's son Berko Rabbinowicz (abbreviated as Babad) was marszalek (deputy) of the seym (parliament) of the Rus lands.
 Abraham Kahane,
 Eleazar Rokach (1718–1734)
 Jakob Jukel Horowitz (1735–1734), the last one of earlier generations;

Among the later line of Brody rabbis we find:

 Nathan Nate b. Arje Löb (1744–1760)
 Isaak Horowitz (1760–1763)
 Joseph Schatzkes (1765–1771)
 Hirsch Zebi from Zamość (1771–1785)
 Meier Kristianpoller (1785–1814)
 Arje Löb Tumim (1814–1830)
 Eliezer Landau (1827–1830)
 Jechiel Michel Kristianpoller (1831–1863)
 Meier Kristianpoller (1866–1886)
 Isaak Chajes (1894–1901)
 M.A. Steinberg (1908–1928)

Brody fostered a number of Maggids and Kabblists including Mose Ostrer, Arje Löb Podhaicer, Salomo or Shlomo Kluger.

Brody Synagogue housed the leaders of Jewish intelligentsia such as Yechezkel Landau and Meyer Margolis. Already mentioned city rabbi Eleazar Rokach was the head rabbi of Brody for 20 years. According to tradition, he was a descendant from the house of King David. He was named after his great-grandfather, rabbi Elazar of Germiza (Mainz), a famous 12th century Kabbalist. He moved from Brody to Amsterdam, Holland. The people of Brody tried unsuccessfully to stop Rabbi Elazar from moving on to Amsterdam, where he and was received with great honor both by Jewish leaders and by representatives of the Dutch government. An interesting legendary story had been told about rabbi Elazar of Brody by his descendant Rabbi Sholom Rokeach the Admor of Belz, that when Rabbi Elazar arrived in Holland, the country was suffering from a plague of worms. The entire country was facing a ruin in the threat of being devoured by the huge numbers of worms. The Dutch king heard about the newly arriving tzaddik of Brody, and asked him for prayer in order to remove this danger. Rabbi Elazar went to the fields to pray.  After finishing his prayer, the entire Netherlands witnessed a wonder: the worms came out of the ground and fell fatally into the sea. As a "reward" for Rabbi Elazar's help, a special coin was issued.  The commemorative coin was minted by the Dutch government for the occasion, bearing the Rabbi's  face and two verses from Psalms. How much truth is in this story, we do not know, however, the authority and influence of Brody Rabbi Elazar were undisputed. After leaving Brody he served for 5 years as head rabbi of Amsterdam. Later he immigrated to the Holy Land settling in Tsfat, where he died and was buried.

Rabbi Shlomo Kluger, the Maggid of Brody

Other famous rabbi associated with Brody was maggid (the preacher) Shlomo Kluger. Rabbi Kluger (1789–1869) was known as the Preacher or Maggid of Brody, and by his acronym Maharshak. He served for fifty years in the Rabbinate of Brody, and was the author of some 174 known books. He was a fierce defender of Judaic traditionalism against the onslaught of the modernistic "Enlightenment" ideology. His Hokhmat Shlomo (wisdom of Solomon if translated from Hebrew, compare 1 Kings 5:10, 14) vividly presents his great erudition in Torah and spiritual subjects, as he compares the views of different authorities and seeks to resolve apparent contradictions between them.

Nahum Gelber reports a story how Maggid Kluger attempted to leave Brody having accepted the invitation of Berezhany community and by an unlucky providence was forced to return to Brody. In 1843, Rabbi Kluger left his community in Brody and accepted the invitation of the community Berezhany community who, in 1845, elected him the supreme judicial authority. Despite the pleas of the Brody community leaders, the Magid left Brody and moved to Berezhany. In the winter of 1845, a delegation from Brody arrived in Berezhany and took him back to their town. In Berezhany he was received with great honor, especially by Rabbi Arie Leibush Natanson, father of the Lviv rabbi, Rabbi Joseph Saul Nathanson, who had served as a Rain Berezhany prior to his appointment as a Rabbi in Lviv. A few days after his first sermon in Berezhany, the Magid caught typhus. He was sick for many years, and through this understood that he should not had left Brody. He vowed to leave Berezhany and return to Brody as soon as his health improved, and no pleading on behalf of Berezhany messengers changed his mind. He resided in Brody as a private person, refraining from intruding into the activities of Brody's new Teacher of Justice. His admirers, and especially Rabbi Joseph Natanson, supported him for the rest of his life.

Literature 

Source article (written by the uploader and contributor of the Wikipedia version)

 Roman Zakharii. Galician Jerusalem – Brody as Jewish Intellectual and Cultural Hub of Eastern Galicia. Article, ca. 20 pp., with pictorial material. Leipzig: Simon Dubnow Institute for Jewish History and Culture at Leipzig University, 2004.
 Ruhama Elbag. Brody between the Lines. A literary journey to the `Jerusalem of Austria' - a hothouse in Galicia for Hebrew and Yiddish literature. Article in Israeli newspaper "Haaretz". April 24, 2003.
 Хонигсман Я., Евреи города Броды (1584–1944) - Jews of the city of Brody / Львовск. общ-во евр. культуры им. Шолом-Алейхема. — Львов, 2001. — 120 с., [8] с. ил. 120 экз.
 An Eternal Light: Brody, in Memoriam. Translation of Ner Tamid: Yizkor leBrody. Edited by: Organization of former Brody residents in Israel, 1994.
 Toldot Yehudei Brody (The History of the Jews of Brody) by Nathan-Michael Gelber.
 D. Wurm. Z dziejów żydowstwa Brodckiego za c zasów dawnej Rzeczypospolitej do 1772 (From the history of Brody Jewry in times of the old Polish state until 1772). Published in Polish. Brody, 1935.
 Tadeusz Lutman. Studyja nad Dziejami Handlu Brodów w latach 1773–1880 / Studies on the History of Commerce in Brody in the years 1773–1880. In Polish.
 Antonella Tiburzi. ''Un mondo estinto. La comunità ebraica di Brody e il suo destino (1941-1945), Ombre corte, 2020.

References

Jewish history
Brody
Brody
Brody